Chris Shar (born Christopher Joshua Shar, November 14, 1978)  is an American multi-instrumentalist and vocalist.

Shar was born and raised on the Jersey shore, predominantly in Toms River, New Jersey. Shar learned to play the drumkit at a young age, and played in a high school band. Shar lived in Philadelphia for a number of years where he joined the band Man Man. Shar is a former member of the bands Stiffed, Man Man (under pseudonym Sergei Sogay),Santigold, and most recently the drummer in Pours, an indie rock band from Burlington, Vermont. Shar lives in Burlington, Vermont. Shar has self-produced a number of songs over the years. Shar is diagnosed with muscular dystrophy.

References

1978 births
Living people
American multi-instrumentalists
21st-century American singers
People from Toms River, New Jersey
Singers from New Jersey
American male drummers
American indie rock musicians
Indie rock drummers
American rock drummers
20th-century American drummers
21st-century American drummers
20th-century American male musicians
21st-century American male singers